Liberalism in Iran or Iranian liberalism is a political ideology that traces its beginnings to the 20th century.

Iranian Liberalism during 1900–1979

Society for the Progress of Iran 
During the constitutional period of Persia and active during the 2nd term of Majlis, 1909–1911, the party Society of the Supporters for Progress championed the development of southern provinces of Persia and was consisted of MPs representing the southerners. They promoted building hospitals, women's education and regarded Persian as "the official and scholarly" language of Iran. The party was liberal Islamic, nationalist, constitutionalist and anti-imperialist.

Its organ Jonub was printed in Tehran and usually criticized Bakhtiaris, and held the view that Iranian government does not understand the importance of the Persian Gulf region. The newspaper defended democracy and civil rights and explained that the "level of progress of any nation is symbolized in its degree of freedom of expression and press" and that the elections are the only means to exercise popular sovereignty and protect territorial integrity as well as national interests.

The party was small and insignificant in numbers, but helped holding the balance of power in the 2nd Majlis, allying with the Moderate Socialists Party and Union and Progress Party against the Democrat Party.

Revival Party 
During 1920s, the secular progressive Revival Party or Modernity Party was formed by young western-educated reformists, it was mainly organized by Ali Akbar Davar, Mohammad Tadayon and Abdolhossein Teymourtash, and was led by former Democrat Party politicians who had lost confidence in the masses, in contrast to the Socialist Party which was led by former Democrats who retained hope to mobilize lower classes. Many constitutionalist veterans were associated with the party, including Mohammad Ali Foroughi, Mostowfi ol-Mamalek, Hassan Taqizadeh, Mohammad-Taqi Bahar and Ebrahim Hakimi. The party had also liberal and nationalist tendencies and supported Reza Khan and helped him become the new Shah of Iran while holding majority in the parliament.

The party's platform was based on "separation of religion and politics, creating a strong army, an efficient administrative system, to end the economic rates, industrialize Iran, instead of replacing domestic investment of foreign capital into the agricultural tribes, development of the income tax system, educational facilities to the public, including women, opportunities for the flourishing of talents, and throughout the promotion of Persian language instead of local languages".

National Front of Iran 

Founded by Mohammad Mosaddegh in 1949, the National Front of Iran it is the oldest and arguably the largest pro-democracy group operating inside Iran despite the fact that it never was able to recover its prominence in the early 1950s. Before 1953 and throughout the 1960s, the front was torn by strife between secular and religious elements and over the time has splintered into various squabbling factions, gradually emerging as the leading organization of secular liberals with nationalist members adhering to liberal democracy and social democracy. Amidst Iranian Revolution, the front supported the replacement of the old monarchy by an Islamic Republic and was the main symbol of "nationalist" tendency in the early years of post-revolutionary government. It was banned in July 1981 and although officially remains illegal and under constant surveillance, is still active inside Iran.

Prominent members are Mohammad Mosaddegh (leader of the party during 1949–1960), Allah-Yar Saleh (leader during 1960–1964), Karim Sanjabi (leader during 1967–1988), Adib Boroumand (leader during 1993–2017) and Davoud Hermidas-Bavand (current spokesperson).

Mohammad Mosaddegh held government office as the Prime Minister of Iran from 1951 until 1953, when his government was overthrown in a coup d'état aided by the United States' Central Intelligence Agency and the United Kingdom's Secret Intelligence Service. An author, administrator, lawyer, and prominent parliamentarian, his administration introduced a range of progressive social and political reforms such as social security and land reforms, including taxation of the rent on land. His government's most notable policy, however, was the nationalization of the Iranian oil industry, which had been under British control since 1913 through the Anglo-Persian Oil Company (APOC/) (later British Petroleum and BP).

Many Iranians regard Mosaddegh as the leading champion of secular democracy and resistance to foreign domination in Iran's modern history. Mosaddegh was removed from power in a coup on 19 August 1953, organized and carried out by the CIA at the request of MI6, which chose Iranian General Fazlollah Zahedi to succeed Mosaddegh. While the coup is commonly referred to in the West as Operation Ajax after its CIA cryptonym, in Iran it is referred to as the 28 Mordad 1332 coup, after its date on the Iranian calendar.

Iran Party 
Established in 1949, the Iran Party is described as the "backbone of the National Front", the leading umbrella organization of Iranian nationalists. Founded by mostly of European-educated technocrats, it advocated "a diluted form of French socialism" (i.e. it "modeled itself on" the moderate Socialist Party of France) and promoted social democracy, liberal nationalism and secularism. The socialist tent of the party was more akin to that of the Fabian Society than to the scientific socialism of Karl Marx. Its focus on liberal socialism and democratic socialism principles, made it quite different from pure left-wing parties and it did not show much involvement in labour rights discussions. The Iran Party's basic nucleus were members of the Iranian Engineers’ Association. In the Iranian legislative election, 1944, five of the party's leaders including Rezazadeh Shafaq, Ghulam'Ali Farivar, AhdulHamid Zanganeh, Hussein Mu'aven, and Abdallah Mu'azemi won seats, as well as Mohammad Mossadegh who was not a member but the party effectively supported. The party helped Mossadegh establish the National Front, nationalize the oil industry and rise to power. Some members held office during Mosaddegh government. In the 1950s, the party was led by Karim Sanjabi and Allah-Yar Saleh. It was suppressed following the British–American backed coup d'état in 1953 and was outlawed in 1957, on the grounds that it had an alliance with the Tudeh Party of Iran ten years earlier. It was revived in 1960 and actively contributed to the National Front (II), which was disintegrated in 1963 and forced to survive secretly. Iran Party held a congress in 1964. Not much is known about the activities of the party between 1964 and the mid-1970s except of some irregular meetings and exchanging views. In 1977, alongside League of Socialists and Nation Party it revived the National Front (IV) and demanded Ruhollah Khomeini's return to Iran. In early 1979, then secretary-general of the party, Shapour Bakhtiar was appointed as the last Prime Minister by the Shah and included two Iran Party members in his cabinet. The party however denounced his acceptance of the post, expelled him and called him a "traitor". The party did not play an important role in Iranian political arena after 1979 and was soon declared banned.

People's Party 
The party was dissolved in 1975, in order to be merged into newly founded Resurgence Party, the only legal party in the attempted single-party system.

Freedom Movement of Iran 

Founded in 1961, the Freedom Movement of Iran (FMI) is an Iranian pro-democracy political organization, its members describes themselves as "Muslims, Iranians, Constitutionalists and Mossadeghists". A split to the National Front (II), the party was established with support and blessings of Mohammad Mossadegh and soon applied for the membership in the front with a platform advocating national sovereignty, freedom of political activity and expression, social justice under Islam, respect for Iran's constitution, the Universal Declaration of Human Rights, and the Charter of the United Nations. It believes in the separation of church and state, while that political activity should be guided by religious values. The party's ideologies are iranian nationalism, islamic democracy, islamic liberalism and constitutionalism.

Despite being outlawed by the prevailing regime in Iran, the group continues to exist. The organization accepts to comply with the Constitution of the Islamic Republic of Iran despite its rejection for Guardianship of the Islamic Jurist. It has been described as a "semi-opposition" or "loyal opposition" party. The organization's members have close ties to the Council of Nationalist-Religious Activists of Iran.

Prominent members are Mehdi Bazargan, Ebrahim Yazdi, Mostafa Chamran, Sadegh Ghotbzadeh and Ali Shariati.

Mehdi Bazargan (1 September 1907 – 20 January 1995), an Iranian scholar, academic, long-time pro-democracy activist, was head of Iran's interim government, making him Iran's first prime minister after the Iranian Revolution of 1979. He resigned his position as prime minister in November 1979, in protest of the US Embassy takeover and as an acknowledgement of his government's failure in preventing it. He was the head of the first engineering department of University of Tehran.

Bazargan is considered to be a respected figure within the ranks of modern Muslim thinkers, well known as a representative of liberal-democratic Islamic thought and a thinker who emphasized the necessity of constitutional and democratic policies. In the immediate aftermath of the revolution Bazargan led a faction that opposed the Revolutionary Council dominated by the Islamic Republican Party and personalities such as Ayatollah Mohammad Hossein Beheshti. He opposed the continuation of the Iran–Iraq War and the involvement of clerics in all aspects of politics, economy and society. Consequently, he faced harassment from militants and young revolutionaries within Iran.

Liberalism in the Islamic Republic: 1979–present

National Democratic Front 
During the Iranian Revolution of 1979 that overthrew shah Mohammad Reza Pahlavi, the liberal-left National Democratic Front was founded by Hedayatollah Matin-Daftari, a grandson of celebrated Iranian nationalist Mohammad Mosaddeq and a "lawyer who had been active in human rights causes" before the downfall of the shah and the son of the fourth prime minister and the jurist Ahmad Matin-Daftari. The party was banned within a short time by the Islamic government. Though it was short-lived, the party has been described as one of "the three major movements of the political center" in Iran at that time.

The NDF "emphasized political freedoms, guarantees for individual rights, access for all political groups to the broadcast media, the curbing of the Revolutionary Guards, revolutionary courts, and revolutionary committees. Its economic programs favored "the mass of the people", and it supported a "decentralized system of administration based on popularly elected local councils."

Along with the Fadayan and some Kurdish groups the NDP boycotted the March 30, 31, 1979 referendum on making Iran an Islamic Republic (the Referendum of 12 Farvardin). In the debate over Iran's new revolutionary constitution it supported a parliamentary democracy with equal rights for women, adoption of the universal declaration of human rights and limited presidential powers. "Expressing concern over the freedom of elections and government control over the broadcast media," along with the National Front they announced they would boycott the election for the 1st Assembly of Experts, which wrote the new constitution.

Executives of Construction of Iran Party 
In 1996, the Executives of Construction Party was founded by 16 members of the cabinet of the then President Akbar Hashemi Rafsanjani. The party is a member of Council for coordinating the Reforms Front.

Economically, the party supports free markets and industrialization; with a high emphasis on the progress and development. The party's ideologies are reformism, pragmatism, technocracy and liberal democracy. It takes the view that economic freedom is fundamentally linked to cultural and political freedom, but it should not be allowed to conflict with development. The party is divided into two factions in constant struggle, the more conservative "Kermani faction" led by Mohammad Hashemi Rafsanjani and Hossein Marashi and the more liberal "Isfahani faction" led by Mohammad Atrianfar and Gholamhossein Karbaschi.

Women's rights 

The Iranian women's movement involves the movement for women's rights and women's equality in Iran. The movement first emerged some time after the Iranian Constitutional Revolution. The first journal published by a woman in Iran was Danesh, started in 1910. The movement lasted until 1933 in which the last women's association was dissolved by the Reza Shah's government. It heightened again after the Iranian Revolution (1979). Between 1962 and 1978, the Iranian women's movement gained tremendous victories: women won the right to vote in 1963 as part of Mohammad Reza Shah's White Revolution, and were allowed to stand for public office, and in 1975 the Family Protection Law provided new rights for women, including expanded divorce and custody rights and reduced polygamy. In 1969 women even began to drive cars and the first women to ever drive a car in Iran was Eileen Zayer from the United States. Following the 1979 Revolution, several laws were established such as the introduction of mandatory veiling and public dress code of females. Women's rights since the Islamic Revolution have varied. In November 2016, about 6% of Iranian parliament members were women, while the global average was about 23%.

Political freedom and dissent 
In a 2008 report, the organization Human Rights Watch complained that "broadly worded 'security laws'" in Iran are used "to arbitrarily suppress and punish individuals for peaceful political expression, association, and assembly, in breach of international human rights treaties to which Iran is party." For example, "connections to foreign institutions, persons, or sources of funding" are enough to bring criminal charges such as "undermining national security" against individuals.

Regarding the gradual unraveling of the reformist movement, an article from The Economist magazine said, The Tehran spring of ten years ago has now given way to a bleak political winter. The new government continues to close down newspapers, silence dissenting voices and ban or censor books and websites. The peaceful demonstrations and protests of the Khatami era are no longer tolerated: in January 2007 security forces attacked striking bus drivers in Tehran and arrested hundreds of them. In March, police beat hundreds of men and women who had assembled to commemorate International Women's Day.

Although relatively peaceful when compared to the state-sponsored assassinations that occurred in the first decade of the Islamic republic, throughout the 1990s the theocratic regime rarely hesitated to apply violent tactics to crush its political adversaries, with demonstrators and dissidents commonly being imprisoned, beaten, tortured or murdered ("disappeared").

The Iran student riots, July 1999 were sparked following an attack by an estimated 400 paramilitary Hezbollah vigilantes on a student dormitory in retaliation for a small, peaceful student demonstration against the closure of the reformist newspaper, Salam earlier that day." At least twenty people were hospitalized and hundreds were arrested," in the attack. Ahmad Batebi, a demonstrator in the July 1999 Iranian student riots, received a death sentence for "propaganda against the Islamic Republic System." (His sentence was later reduced to 15, and then ten years imprisonment.)

See also 
 History of Iran
 Politics of Iran
 List of political parties in Iran

Notes

References 

 Richards, Alan. A Political Economy of the Middle East 2nd Ed. Westview Press Boulder, CO 1998
 Postel, Danny. Reading 'Legitimation Crisis' in Tehran, Prickly Paradigm Press
 Iran Enters the Liberalism Era, Iran Press Service, July 3, 2006
 Codrescu, Andrei., Liberalism in Iran, Monterey County Weekly, January 11, 2007
 Walking the Tightrope, The New Humanist Vol. 121 Issue 5 September/October 2006
 'Alí Rizā Awsatí (عليرضا اوسطى), Iran in the Past Three Centuries (Irān dar Se Qarn-e Goz̲ashteh - ايران در سه قرن گذشته), Volumes 1 and 2 (Paktāb Publishing - انتشارات پاکتاب, Tehran, Iran, 2003).  (Vol. 1),  (Vol. 2).
 Report 2001, Islamic Republic of Iran, Amnesty International
 Latifiyan, Ali. Reviewing the performance of intellectuals from 1941 to 1979. Imam Sadiq University, CO 1995

 
Politics of Iran